Miralem Pjanić (born 2 April 1990) is a Bosnian professional footballer who plays as a midfielder for UAE Pro League club Sharjah and the Bosnia and Herzegovina national team.

Pjanić started his professional career at Metz being there for one season. He signed for side Lyon in 2008 before signing for Roma in 2011 after three seasons at Lyon. During his time in Rome, Pjanić came to be recognized as one of the best midfielders in Serie A. In 2016, Pjanić joined Juventus, and has since been considered an integral player for the team, winning four Serie A titles, two Coppa Italias, and being named in the Serie A Team of the Year for 2015–16, 2016–17, 2017–18 and 2018–19 seasons. He was also named in the 2016–17 UEFA Champions League Squad of the Season, for his role in Juventus's run to the final. Pjanić joined Barcelona in September 2020.

A former Luxembourg youth international, Pjanić made his senior international debut for Bosnia and Herzegovina in 2008, earning over one hundred caps and scoring eighteen goals since. He represented the nation at their first major tournament, the 2014 FIFA World Cup.

In 2015, Pjanić was ranked 55th in The Guardians list of "The 100 best footballers in the world".
In 2019, he was ranked 50th in the same list.

Early life
Pjanić was born on 2 April 1990 in Tuzla, SR Bosnia and Herzegovina, in what was then SFR Yugoslavia (modern-day Bosnia and Herzegovina); to father Fahrudin Pjanić and mother Fatima. He developed an interest in footballing through his father, a former third division footballer in Yugoslavia, and began his football career in Luxembourg following his family's arrival to the country shortly before the outbreak of the Bosnian War. While in Luxembourg, Pjanić often attended training sessions and matches with his father. At the age of seven, his father discovered that he had talent and an interest in football and allowed his son to join local club FC Schifflange 95 in Schifflange. While at Schifflange, Pjanić drew interest from several Belgian, Dutch and German clubs, but agreed to join Metz in France in 2004. Pjanić was recommended by former Metz player and Luxembourg international Guy Hellers.

Club career
Metz
Pjanić joined Metz at age 14 on a youth contract and spent approximately three years in the club's academy. In the 2005–06 season, he played on the under-16 team that won the Championnat National des 16 ans and, following the season, signed a five-year élite contract with the club. After spending the 2006–07 season with the club's under-18 team, Pjanić was promoted to the club's amateur team in the Championnat de France Amateur for the 2007–08 season. He appeared in the first two matches of the campaign before earning a call up to the senior team by manager Francis De Taddeo. Pjanić made his professional football debut, at the age of 17, on 18 August 2007 in a league match against Paris Saint-Germain. He appeared as a substitute in a 0–0 draw. The following week, he earned his first start in a 2–0 defeat to Rennes.

After a string of respectable appearances, on 30 November 2007, Pjanić signed his first professional contract agreeing to a three-year deal, tying him to Metz until 2010. After becoming professional, he was assigned the number 15 shirt. Pjanić scored his first professional goal for Metz on 15 December 2007 in a 2–1 defeat against Sochaux converting on a penalty in the 88th minute, thus becoming one of the youngest players to score a goal in Ligue 1 history. Among his other positive performances included converting another penalty in a 2–1 loss to Nice and scoring on the final day of the season against Le Mans in a thrilling 4–3 victory.

Pjanić's play in the Coupe de France was with distinction as well appearing in and starting all four matches the club contested. He assisted on several goals in the club's 6–1 demolition of Vesoul Haute-Saône. In the ensuing round, Pjanić scored the final goal in Metz's 3–0 triumph over Strasbourg and played the full 90 minutes in the club's 1–0 win over Lorient in the Round of 16 helping the club who were, at the time, struggling in domestic play, reach the quarterfinals of the Coupe de France. Metz were eventually eliminated by the eventual champions Lyon.
In total, Pjanić made 38 appearances and scored 5 goals with Metz. For his efforts, he was nominated for the Ligue 1 Young Player of the Year award, won by Hatem Ben Arfa.

Though Pjanić was in great form throughout the season, Metz still suffered relegation back to Ligue 2, prompting speculation that the young star would move to any of a host of clubs, with English clubs Arsenal and Chelsea, Spanish clubs Barcelona and Real Madrid, Italian clubs Milan and Inter, and French club Lyon vying for his services.

Lyon
After Metz received numerous offers for the player's services, on 6 June 2008, Pjanić and Metz both reached an agreement with Olympique Lyonnais for the transfer of the player. Pjanić agreed to a five-year contract, while the transfer fee was priced at €7.5 million plus future incentives.

Labeled as the future replacement for the ageing Juninho, Pjanić was initially given the number 12 shirt, but switched to the number 18 for pre-season and made his club debut in the team's Trophée des Champions defeat to Bordeaux. He made his league debut in the opening league match of the season against Toulouse playing the entire match in a 3–0 victory. Pjanić's debut season with Lyon was cut in half after fracturing his fibula in a match against Sochaux in October 2008, as a result of a bad tackle by Stéphane Dalmat. Despite initially being diagnosed as missing a month, he missed two months and made his return on 3 January 2009 in the club's 6–0 thrashing of amateur club US Concarneau in the Coupe de France playing 66 minutes.

For the 2009–10 season, Pjanić switched to the number 8 shirt, formerly worn by his predecessor and Lyon great Juninho. He started the season strong scoring his first career goal for Lyon on a free kick in Lyon's playoff round match against Belgian club Anderlecht in the UEFA Champions League. Lyon won the match 5–1. A couple of days later, he scored his first career league goal for the club, in which his side won 3–0 at Auxerre. Pjanić continued his stellar play in the Champions League scoring the only goal in the club's opening group stage match against Italian club Fiorentina. In the club's second group stage match against Hungarian club Debreceni, he scored again, via free kick, and also assisted on two other goals in the club's 4–0 victory. On 10 March 2010, Pjanić scored the equalizing goal in Lyon's 1–1 draw with Spanish club Real Madrid in the second leg of their first knockout round tie in the UEFA Champions League. The draw sent Lyon through to the quarter-finals due to their 1–0 win in the first leg at the Stade Gerland.

Pjanić began the 2010–11 season as a starter and featured in the team's first three games. However, following the arrival of Yoann Gourcuff, he began appearing as a substitute and, subsequently, appeared as a substitute in the team's next seven league matches. On 29 September 2010, Pjanić scored his first goal of the season in the team's 3–1 win over Israeli club Hapoel Tel Aviv in the UEFA Champions League. As a result of his good form, Claude Puel began experimenting playing both Gourcuff and Pjanić in the midfield, but after playing the two in a 2–0 win over Portuguese club Benfica in the Champions League and a 1–1 draw with Rennes in the league, this tactic was abandoned.

Roma

On 31 August 2011, Pjanić agreed a four-year deal with Italian club Roma, for an €11 million transfer fee. He scored his first goal for Roma against Lecce.

Pjanić started the 2012–13 season mostly on the bench. He got his chance in a Derby della Capitale and scored a goal. From that game, he started playing regularly and scored one more goal in 2–0 win over Torino and one in the Coppa Italia against Atalanta. In the 2013–14 season, under new Roma coach Rudi Garcia, he was a starter in the 4–3–3 midfield, playing a key role to the team's Serie A record of ten wins in the first ten season matches.

Pjanić scored 6 goals and provided 6 assists in the 2013–14 Serie A season. On 25 April 2014, he scored the first goal in Roma's 2–0 victory over Milan; the goal was a wonderful individual display from Pjanić, as he dribbled past Sulley Muntari, Riccardo Montolivo, and Adil Rami before putting the ball in the net.

On 11 May 2014, Pjanić signed a new contract which will last until 30 June 2018. In a friendly tournament in Denver in July, he scored from inside his own half, but Roma lost 3–2 to Manchester United. In the 2014–15 season, he became considered as a rising star in Italian football, scoring 5 times and assisting 10 goals.

In the 2015–16 season, Pjanić emerged as one of the world's finest free-kick takers, netting a brilliant goal against Juventus on 30 August and scoring several more, including in the Champions League against Bayer Leverkusen. By the January break, he had scored 7 goals and assisted another 5, being linked with a transfer to Barcelona and Real Madrid in the winter transfer window. Towards the end of the season, rumours spread in the media of Pjanić's possible departure from Roma, as he was linked with Juventus. He finished the season with ten league goals, and 12 in all competitions, while also finishing the league season as the top assist provider in Serie A for the second consecutive season, alongside Juventus' Paul Pogba, with 12 assists.

Juventus

On 13 June 2016, Pjanić joined Juventus on a five-year contract for a fee of €32 million, ending a five-year stint with Roma. He chose the number 5 shirt to start the new season. On 10 September, Pjanić scored on his debut in a 3–1 home win over Sassuolo. After winning Coppa Italia and Serie A in his first season, he missed out on a potential treble, having lost in the Champions League Final to Real Madrid.

Pjanić's second season at Juventus began with a 2–3 loss against Lazio in the 2017 Supercoppa Italiana. He scored his first goal of the season in city derby against Torino on 23 September 2017. Juventus won the game 4–0. On 28 February, Pjanić scored a crucial penalty against Atalanta to send Juventus through to the 2018 Coppa Italia Final. Juventus won that final, with Pjanić contributing by assisting for one of the goals in a convincing triumph over Milan on 9 May 2018. Four days later, Pjanić once again became Serie A champion in a game against his old club Roma, which sealed his second domestic double in two seasons. On 19 May, the final match of the season, he scored his fifth league goal of the season, netting a trademark free kick, which sealed Juventus's 2–1 home win over Hellas Verona.

At the beginning of his third campaign with the club, Pjanić put pen to paper on a new five-year contract. He scored his first goal of the season in a 2–0 home win over Lazio on 25 August 2018. On 19 September, in his first UEFA Champions League game of the season, Pjanić helped his team to a win by converting two penalties against Valencia in an eventual 2–0 victory. On 6 October, in a game against Udinese, he made his 100th appearance for Juventus.

On 21 September 2019, Pjanić won his 100th match with Juventus in all competitions in a 2–1 home win over Verona in Serie A.

On 26 July 2020, he won his fourth league title with the club after defeating Sampdoria 2–0 at home. He made his final appearance for the club on 7 August, in a 2–1 home win over his former club Lyon in the second leg of the round of 16 of the UEFA Champions League; however, despite the victory, the result saw Juventus eliminated from the competition on away goals following a 2–2 aggregate draw.

Barcelona
On 29 June 2020, Juventus announced that they had reached an agreement with Barcelona for the transfer of Pjanić on a deal worth €60 million, plus a maximum of €5 million in bonuses, to be effective following the conclusion of the 2019–20 season. The deal was also coordinated with a swap of Arthur, whom Juve signed for €72 million, plus a maximum of €10 million in bonuses. Pjanić signed a contract with the Spanish side for the next four seasons, until the end of the 2023–24 campaign, with a buy-out clause of €400 million. He made his debut on 27 September, coming on as a substitute in a 4–0 home win over Villarreal in La Liga.

However, Pjanić's stint at Barcelona was unsuccessful, as he made 30 appearances for the club (being named 13 times in the starting XI) and spent an average of 43 minutes on the pitch but did not score or assist any goals.

Loan to Beşiktaş
On 2 September 2021, Pjanić joined Beşiktaş on a season-long loan.

Sharjah
On 7 September 2022, Pjanić joined UAE Pro League club Sharjah FC.

International career
Luxembourg
Due to spending his childhood in Luxembourg, Pjanić became eligible for their national team and begun representing the nation's youth sides. He represented Luxembourg in the 2006 European Under-17 Championship, for which Luxembourg qualified automatically as hosts. He scored Luxembourg's only goal of the tournament. In that same year, he scored 4 goals in a match against Belgium, which ended in a 5–5 draw. Before making his decision regarding his national team status, Pjanić was eligible to represent Luxembourg and Bosnia and Herzegovina.

Bosnia and Herzegovina

In May 2008, during an interview for Bosnian newspaper, Pjanić stated that he wanted to play for Bosnia and Herzegovina. Eventually, officials in the Football Association of Bosnia and Herzegovina took notice and Pjanić was called-up to the country's under-21 team. However, because Pjanić no longer had a Bosnian passport and needed FIFA approval to switch nationalities, he wasn't allowed to be called-up for the senior team. After an eight-month wait and following the involvement of Željko Komšić, the Croat member of the Presidency of Bosnia and Herzegovina, Pjanić received a Bosnian passport in early 2008.

He debuted for Bosnia and Herzegovina on 20 August 2008 in the team's 1–2 loss to Bulgaria. On 3 March 2010, he scored his first senior international goal in Bosnia and Herzegovina's 2–1 win over Ghana in Sarajevo.

Pjanić was instrumental in Bosnia and Herzegovina's qualification for 2014 FIFA World Cup, their first major competition, and he was named in 23-man squad for the tournament. He debuted in the team's opening group match, a narrow defeat to Argentina at the Maracanã Stadium. On 25 June, during the final group match against Iran, Pjanić scored a goal, leading to a 3–1 victory to help Bosnia and Herzegovina to their first ever FIFA World Cup win.

On 31 March 2021, he played his 100th match for Bosnia and Herzegovina in a 1–0 loss to France in the 2022 FIFA World Cup qualification.

Style of play
Nicknamed "il Piccolo Principe" ("the Little Prince") during his time with Roma, Pjanić was regarded as one of the most promising young midfielders of his generation in his youth, and was included in Don Balón's list of the 100 best young players in the world in 2010; however, he was also thought to lack composure at times in the media. His Juventus manager Massimiliano Allegri touted him as a potentially world class midfielder in 2016, later also adding that, although he was extremely talented, he needed to stay more "calm and focused" in order to fulfil his potential; subsequently, the 2016–17 season saw him establish himself as one of the best, most skillful, and most versatile midfielders in Europe. Although he is neither particularly quick, nor gifted with athleticism or physical strength, Pjanić has been described as an efficient "old-fashioned playmaker with huge technical qualities". 

A talented, creative, and tenacious midfielder, with quick feet, Pjanić is usually deployed in a central midfield role, or as a deep-lying playmaker in front of the back-line, although his tactical versatility, defensive awareness, and work-rate enable him to play in several midfield positions, and he has also been used in more advanced roles as an offensive-minded central midfielder, known as the "mezzala" role, in Italian, or even as an attacking midfielder, and has even been deployed as a second striker on occasion. 

Pjanić's main attributes are his range of passing, dribbling skills, and vision, which make him an excellent assist provider, and also enable him to dictate the tempo of his team's play in midfield and orchestrate goalscoring opportunities for his teammates. Known for his eye for goal from midfield and striking ability from distance, Pjanić is also known for having the capacity to get into good scoring positions by making late attacking runs into the penalty area from behind. A renowned set-piece specialist, he is highly regarded for his accurate, bending free-kicks, as well as his delivery from dead-ball situations; in 2015, he was described as the best free-kick taker in the world by renowned set-piece specialist and former Lyon teammate Juninho. Pjanić's precocious talent, playmaking skills, and ability to score many goals from free kicks saw him labelled as a potential heir to Juninho at Lyon. However, despite his ability and the praise he has garnered from pundits, due to his elegant and creative playing style, Pjanić has also drawn criticism on occasion in the media for being inconsistent, while Livio Caferoglu of Football Italia accused him of being "too slight to impose himself as a defensive midfielder," and "too slow to release the ball."

Personal life
Pjanić is a Muslim and an ethnic Bosniak. He has a son named Edin with his longtime girlfriend, Josepha from Nice. Along with his native Bosnian, Pjanić is fluent in six additional languages: Luxembourgish, French, English, German, Italian and Spanish. In 2014, Pjanić was enrolled at the University of Sarajevo, majoring in sport and physical education.

In 2009, while playing for Lyon, he stated: "I have followed Real Madrid since the days of Zidane and Ronaldo, when I fell in love. Since then, it is my preferred club and it always will be." Later, when he was a Roma player, he confirmed that he had been a fan of Real Madrid since his childhood.

Throughout the 2017–18 season, Pjanić appeared in the Netflix's docu-series First Team: Juventus.

Career statistics
Club

International

Scores and results list Bosnia and Herzegovina's goal tally first

HonoursJuventusSerie A: 2016–17, 2017–18, 2018–19, 2019–20
Coppa Italia: 2016–17, 2017–18
Supercoppa Italiana: 2018
UEFA Champions League runner-up: 2016–17BarcelonaCopa del Rey: 2020–21BeşiktaşTurkish Super Cup: 2021Individual'
Bosnian Footballer of the Year: 2014
Serie A Team of the Year: 2015–16, 2016–17, 2017–18, 2018–19
UEFA Champions League Team of the Season: 2016–17
Globe Soccer Awards Player Career Award: 2019
Bosnian Sportsman of the Year: 2020

See also
List of men's footballers with 100 or more international caps

References

External links

1990 births
Living people
Bosniaks of Bosnia and Herzegovina
Luxembourgian people of Bosnia and Herzegovina descent
Yugoslav Wars refugees
Bosnia and Herzegovina emigrants to Luxembourg
Bosnia and Herzegovina Muslims
Sportspeople from Tuzla
Luxembourgian footballers
Bosnia and Herzegovina footballers
Association football midfielders
Ligue 1 players
Serie A players
La Liga players
Süper Lig players
UAE Pro League players
FC Metz players
Olympique Lyonnais players
A.S. Roma players
Juventus F.C. players
FC Barcelona players
Beşiktaş J.K. footballers
Sharjah FC players
Luxembourg youth international footballers
Bosnia and Herzegovina international footballers
2014 FIFA World Cup players
Bosnia and Herzegovina expatriate footballers
Bosnia and Herzegovina expatriate sportspeople in France
Bosnia and Herzegovina expatriate sportspeople in Italy
Bosnia and Herzegovina expatriate sportspeople in Spain
Bosnia and Herzegovina expatriate sportspeople in Turkey
Bosnia and Herzegovina expatriate sportspeople in the United Arab Emirates
Expatriate footballers in France
Expatriate footballers in Italy
Expatriate footballers in Spain
Expatriate footballers in Turkey
Expatriate footballers in the United Arab Emirates
FIFA Century Club